Puerto Rico Highway 160 (PR-160) is a rural road that travels from Vega Baja, Puerto Rico to Morovis. This highway begins at PR-2 east of downtown Vega Baja and ends at PR-159 in Unibón.

Major intersections

See also

 List of highways numbered 160

References

External links
 

160